Donnerjack is a science fiction novel begun by American author Roger Zelazny and completed after his death by his companion Jane Lindskold. It was published in 1997.

The original title of the book was "Donnerjack, of Virtú". Initially, Zelazny intended for it to be the first of an ambitious trilogy, with the two sequels tentatively named "The Gods of Virtú" and "Virtú, Virtú". Zelazny completed a few hundred pages of the first novel and left detailed notes for its remainder, which Lindskold completed, attempting to write in his style.  Its description of the virtual world of Virtu has been considered as prefiguring the modern internet.

Plot
Donnerjack is set in a world that has developed a shared, fully immersive virtual reality.  This virtual reality, referred to as Virtu, has come to dominate all aspects of society. People work, play, and can lead entire lives in Virtu.

The eponymous John Donnerjack is one of the creators of Virtu, and a peerless engineer, capable of building just about anything in his virtual reality. The story follows John's final adventure, where he saves his lover from Death itself, and continues on through the perspective of his son, Jack. Many aspects of Donnerjack directly parallel famous myths and legends, particularly those conforming to Joseph Campbell's theory of the monomyth.

It is heavily implied throughout the novel that, though humanity experiences it as a virtual reality simulation, Virtu may actually be an unintentional bridge to the magical realms described in mythology.

It is not connected with Jack of Shadows written by Zelazny years before.

Critical response

Kirkus found it overcomplicated and in need of editing, but full of ideas.

SF Site gave it a positive review.  In contrast, SF Reviews rated it 0/5: "awful".

References

1997 novels
1997 science fiction novels
Collaborative novels
Novels by Roger Zelazny
Avon (publisher) books
Novels by Jane Lindskold